War Eagle is an unincorporated community in Benton County, Arkansas, United States. It is the location of (or is the nearest community to) War Eagle Bridge, which carries CR 98 over War Eagle Creek and is listed on the National Register of Historic Places.

Variant names were "Blackburn Mill", "Wareagle", and "War Eagle Mills". The community takes its name from War Eagle Mill, a local gristmill on War Eagle Creek. A post office called War Eagle Mills was established in 1876, the name was changed to Wareagle in 1894, and the post office closed in 1967.

References

External links

Unincorporated communities in Benton County, Arkansas
Unincorporated communities in Arkansas
1876 establishments in Arkansas